This is the screen and stage filmography of the American actor and producer James Woods, who is known for his work in various film, television and stage productions.

Films

Television

Theatre

Video games

See also
 List of awards and nominations received by James Woods

References

Woods, James
Woods, James